The Derbeke is a river in the Republic of Sakha in Russia. It is a left hand tributary of the Adycha, of the Yana basin.

It is an excellent river for boating, but it flows in an area without permanent population.

Course 
The river begins in a rocky gorge in the eastern flank of the Khunkhadin Range, part of the southern section of the Verkhoyansk Range. It heads roughly north and northeast, leaving the Verkhoyansk mountains, and meandering slowly across a swampy area in the Yana Plateau with numerous lakes, including Lake Emanda. The river gains speed again in its lower course at the feet of the southeastern side of the Nelgesin Range when it flows through a narrow mountain valley. Finally it joins the Adycha upstream from the Nelgese, the largest tributary.

The main tributaries of the Derbeke are the Tenkeli and the Kende. The river freezes in late September and is under thick ice until the end of May. For part of the winter it is usually frozen to the bottom.

See also
List of rivers of Russia
Yana-Oymyakon Highlands§Hydrography

References

Rivers of the Sakha Republic
Verkhoyansk Range